Pada River is a river in Lääne-Viru County, Estonia. It runs into the Gulf of Finland.

Trouts and Thymallus thymallus live in the river.

References

Rivers of Estonia
Lääne-Viru County